Sir Herbert Samuel Leon, 1st Baronet (11 February 1850 – 23 July 1926) was an English financier and Liberal Party politician, now best known as the main figure in the development of the Bletchley Park estate in Buckinghamshire.

Life

He was the second son of George Isaac Leon, a stockbroker, and Julia Ann Samuel. He was elected as the Member of Parliament (MP) for Buckingham at an 1891 by-election, after his predecessor Sir Edmund Verney had been expelled from the House of Commons. He was re-elected in 1892, but was defeated at the 1895 general election.  He stood for Parliament one more time, when he was unsuccessful at the 1906 general election in Handsworth division of Staffordshire.

He served as High Sheriff of Buckinghamshire in 1909 and was created a baronet in the 1911 Coronation honours.

Over the years Leon acquired many plots of land in which he donated for public and educational uses. Leon gave the land of which is now known as Leon Recreational ground to the local council in demand for it to become a public park for the youth of Fenny Stratford and Bletchley. He also donated other plots of land in the south of Bletchley for them to become public schools for the local children of the Lakes Estate.

Leon was Chairman of the Rationalist Press Association, 1913–1922.

In 1970 Leon School and Sports College was built on the Lakes Estate in Bletchley in Leon's honour. In September 2012 the school was renamed as Sir Herbert Leon Academy as a sign of appreciation for the works and funding Leon and his late wife had brought to the local area.

The actor John Standing is a descendant.

References

External links

‘A Maudlin and Monstrous Pile’: The Mansion at Bletchley Park, Buckinghamshire by Kathryn A. Morrison, Transactions of the Ancient Monument Society (PDF)
British Jews in the First World War

1850 births
1926 deaths
Liberal Party (UK) MPs for English constituencies
Baronets in the Baronetage of the United Kingdom
UK MPs 1886–1892
UK MPs 1892–1895
High Sheriffs of Buckinghamshire
English Jews
Jewish British politicians